Kenneth Wesley Jarrold CBE (born 19 May 1948), better known as Ken Jarrold, is a British health service manager.

Jarrold was educated at St Lawrence College, Ramsgate, and Sidney Sussex College, Cambridge, where he gained a first-class degree in history. He was President of the Cambridge Union.

From December 2011 to March 2016 he was Chair of North Staffordshire Combined Healthcare NHS Trust. He was appointed chair of the Rebalancing Medicines Legislation and Pharmacy Regulation Programme Board in 2013.

He lives at Stockton on Tees and Newcastle upon Tyne.

He joined the NHS in 1969 as a National Administrative Trainee having been awarded a first class honours degree in History at Cambridge University and having been President of the Cambridge Union Society. He was a chief executive of district, regional and strategic health authorities for 19 years. He was a board member of the NHS Executive and spent three years at national level as the Director of Human Resources and Deputy to the Chief Executive of the NHS in England.

He is currently the chairman of Cumbria, Northumberland, Tyne and Wear NHS Foundation Trust.

Publications
Other People's Shoes: 40 Questions for Leaders and Managers, CreateSpace Independent Publishing Platform, 2018

References

1948 births
Living people
Administrators in the National Health Service
Alumni of Sidney Sussex College, Cambridge
British civil servants
Commanders of the Order of the British Empire
English healthcare chief executives
Presidents of the Cambridge Union